David Cameron Lovell (born 17 February 1955) is an Australian cricketer. He played in three first-class matches for South Australia in 1980/81.

See also
 List of South Australian representative cricketers

References

External links
 

1955 births
Living people
Australian cricketers
South Australia cricketers
Cricketers from Adelaide